Urquhart may refer to:

 Urquhart, Moray, a village in the parish of Urquhart in the county of Moray, Scotland
 Urquhart (surname), a surname (and list of people with the surname)
 Clan Urquhart, a Scottish clan
 Urquhart and Glenmoriston, a parish in the county of Inverness-shire, Highland, Scotland, see List of listed buildings in Urquhart and Glenmoriston
 Urquhart Castle
 Urquhart and Logie Wester, a parish in the county of Ross and Cromarty, Scotland
 Urquhart, Georgia, a community in the United States

See also
 Glen Urquhart (disambiguation)